Today's Traveller (TT) is an Indian monthly travel magazine published since 1997. Based in New Delhi.

References

 www.magzter.com/IN/Gill-India/Today%27s-Traveller/Travel/19578
 www.eturbonews.com/tag/todays-traveller-magazine

Monthly magazines published in India
Magazines established in 1997
Magazines published in Delhi
Tourism magazines
Tourism in India
Consumer magazines